Khin Maung Lwin (born 27 December 1988) is a Burmese footballer.

He is the former captain of the Myanmar.

International
In 2007, He represent the Myanmar U-23 to The Final of 2007 SEA Games. But Crused by Thailad U-23. 
 so Myanmar only get Silver Medal.

References

1988 births
Living people
Sportspeople from Yangon
Burmese footballers
Myanmar international footballers
Kanbawza F.C. players
Yangon United F.C. players
Association football defenders
Southeast Asian Games silver medalists for Myanmar
Southeast Asian Games medalists in football
Competitors at the 2007 Southeast Asian Games